Westmount is a suburb on the Island of Montreal, Quebec, Canada.

Westmount may also refer to:

Places
Westmount, Nova Scotia, Canada
Westmount, Edmonton, Alberta, Canada
Westmount Subdivision, Halifax Nova Scotia, Canada
Westmount, London, Ontario, Canada
Westmount Adjacent, Montreal, Quebec, Canada
Westmount, Saskatoon, Saskatchewan, Canada

Schools
Westmount Collegiate Institute, Thornhill, Ontario, Canada
Westmount Charter School, Calgary, Alberta, Canada
Westmount High School, Westmount, Quebec, Canada
Westmount Park School, Westmount, Quebec, Canada
Westmount Secondary School, Hamilton, Ontario, Canada

Shopping centres
Westmount Mall, London, Ontario, Canada
Westmount Centre, Edmonton, Alberta, Canada

Other uses
Westmount (provincial electoral district), a former Quebec provincial electoral district
Westmount–Saint-Louis, a Quebec provincial electoral district
, a United States Shipping Board vessel in service 1919-27
Westmount Transit Centre, Edmonton, Alberta, Canada

See also

 Mount West, Antarctica
 Westmont (disambiguation)
 West Mountain (disambiguation)
 Mountain west (disambiguation)
 Mount (disambiguation)
 West (disambiguation)